Surrey Docks Farm is a working city farm in the heart of London.  It occupies a  site on the south bank of the River Thames in Rotherhithe.

Activities

The farm works with local communities and the people of Southwark to provide opportunities for people to learn about farming and food production, and to be actively involved in the ongoing work of the farm. Animals reared on the farm include Toggenburg and Anglo-Nubian goats, Oxford Down sheep, Oxford Sandy and Black pigs, ducks, geese, chickens, ferrets, rabbits, Guinea pigs, donkeys, a miniature Shetland pony and bees. The herds and flocks are farmed with specific attention to animal welfare. There are a variety of green and horticultural areas such as the orchard, herb garden, dye garden, vegetable plots, and the wild area home to native species of birds and amphibians. Fresh food and produce are on sale to the public. Other facilities include a bee room, café, working blacksmith’s forge and adult education rooms. There is a fully equipped classroom used by schools from across London.

Management

The farm is managed by the Surrey Docks Farm Provident Society Ltd, a tax exempt charitable organisation registered with the Financial Services Authority, and with HM Revenue & Customs (registration number 22829R).  Current patrons of the Society include the Bishop of Southwark and former MP Simon Hughes.  The Society particularly encourages membership applications from local people to ensure that they are at the forefront of what is essentially a local community project.  Committee members of the Provident Society are elected at the Annual General Meeting.

History
The farm was first established in 1975 on a  site of derelict dockland between the entrance to Greenland Dock and the River Thames on Rotherhithe Street by Hilary Peters. Its initial purpose was to try and raise livestock and produce food from what was regarded as wasteland.  In April 1980 the Farm registered as a Provident Society; it has now become a community benefit society.

In June 1986 the farm was re-located to its present site, a new  site on the River Thames at South Wharf.  During the working lifetime of the docks South Wharf formed part of the largest shipyard on the Rotherhithe peninsula. It subsequently became a timber wharf, and then, from 1883, it became the Metropolitan Asylums Board's South Wharf Receiving Station for transfer of smallpox and fever patients. The receiving station was bombed in 1940, and not rebuilt.

For the last few years of his life until June 2011, the farm was managed by local campaigner Barry Mason.

In 2019 with funding allocated by Southwark Council the farm started work on its Riverfront Development plan to transform the site's unused and abandoned spaces into a new range of community facilities.

References

External links
 Surrey Docks City Farm
 Surrey Docks Farm: the last 280 years

Buildings and structures in the London Borough of Southwark
Tourist attractions in the London Borough of Southwark
City farms in London
Rotherhithe